Čupić is a Serbian surname, a patronymic derived from the nickname Čupo, meaning "mug" or "jar". It may refer to:

Čedomir Čupić (born 1947), Serbian political scientist and lawyer
Ivan Čupić (born 1986), Croatian handballer
Ljubo Čupić (1913–1942), Yugoslav communist
Miloš Čupić (born 1999), Serbian football goalkeeper
Stefan Čupić (born 1994), Serbian football goalkeeper
Stojan Čupić (1765–1815), Serbian Revolutionary

Serbian surnames
Croatian surnames